Sujata Mehta is an Indian actress of Gujarati origin who has acted in plays and Bollywood films, most known for her lead role in Pratighaat (1987) supporting roles in Yateem (1988) and Gunaah (1993). She also played the lead role in the critically acclaimed and National Award winning Malayalam movie Purushartham (1987).

Early career 
Sujata started her acting career by participating in Gujarati stage plays wherein she played small cameos and, on sheer hard work and perseverance, graduated to playing lead roles.

Bollywood career 
Her first big break came in N. Chandra's social film Pratighaat (1987) with Nana Patekar, where she played a college teacher who is stripped naked in public by gangsters.  The role was originally played by Vijayashanti in the Telugu film Pratighatna (1986).  Sujata was noticed and appreciated for her stellar performance in the film.

In her next film Yateem (1988), directed by J. P. Dutta, she played a lustful step-mother who attempts to seduce her step-son, is rebuffed by him, and then falsely accuses him of raping her. Her performance in Yateem won her accolades and critical acclaim and also a Filmfare Best Supporting Actress nomination. Sujata did not confine herself to a certain image. She played all kinds of roles, irrespective of being positive or negative.

She was also seen in some other films like Tyaagi (1992), Gunaah (1993), Aaaj ki Aurat (1993), Dhartiputra (1993), Hulchul (1995), Judge Mujrim (1997) and others.

TV career 
After appearing in the TV series Khandaan (1985) and Shrikant (1987) she has returned to Indian TV soap operas, playing mother's roles on shows like Yeh Meri Life Hai and Kyaa Hoga Nimmo Kaa  (2006).

Filmography

Film

Television

References

External links
 

Living people
Gujarati people
Indian film actresses
Indian stage actresses
Indian television actresses
Indian soap opera actresses
Actresses in Hindi cinema
20th-century Indian actresses
21st-century Indian actresses
Gujarati theatre
Actresses in Hindi television
Year of birth missing (living people)